St. Clair Township is one of thirteen townships in Butler County, Ohio, United States.  The township consists of three disconnected pieces located along the Great Miami River in the central portion of the county. It had a population of 6,671 at the 2020 census.

History

One of the original five townships of Butler County, it was erected by the Butler County Court of Quarter Sessions on May 10, 1803.

The area of the township has been significantly reduced from the original boundaries. Four new townships were created from it:  Milford Township and Wayne Township, both on December 2, 1805; Reily Township on December 7, 1807; and Hanover Township (from parts of St. Clair and Ross townships) on December 2, 1811. What is now Oxford Township was originally within the bounds of St. Clair Township, Oxford having been erected from Milford Township in 1811.

From these reduced borders, which consisted of nineteen whole and nine fractional sections, a substantial area has been withdrawn from the township because of annexations by the city of Hamilton. Most of the area of Hamilton west of the Great Miami River, the township's southern boundary, was originally included in St. Clair Township. In 1857, a paper township, Hamilton, was erected from parts of St. Clair and Fairfield townships.

Name
It is named for General Arthur St. Clair, governor of the Northwest Territory before Ohio's statehood. Statewide, the only other St. Clair Township is located in Columbiana County.

Geography
Located in the center of the county, it borders the following townships:
Wayne Township - north
Madison Township - east
Fairfield Township - south
Ross Township - southwest
Hanover Township - west
Milford Township - northwest corner

Three unincorporated communities are located in St. Clair Township: Overpeck and Williamsdale in the center, and Woodsdale in the southeast along the border with Madison Township.

Government
The township is governed by a three-member board of trustees, who are elected in November of odd-numbered years to a four-year term beginning on the following January 1.  Two are elected in the year after the presidential election and one is elected in the year before it.  There is also an elected township fiscal officer, who serves a four-year term beginning on April 1 of the year after the election, which is held in November of the year before the presidential election.  Vacancies in the fiscal officership or on the board of trustees are filled by the remaining trustees.

Roads and industry
The principal highways are U.S. Route 127 (the main road between Hamilton and Eaton), and State Routes 128 and 177.

The Miller Brewing Company operates a brewery in the northeast, on the line with Madison Township. The Cincinnati Gas and Electric Company has a generating plant in the township.

References

Bert S. Barlow, W.H. Todhunter, Stephen D. Cone, Joseph J. Pater, and Frederick Schneider, eds.  Centennial History of Butler County, Ohio.  Hamilton, Ohio:  B.F. Bowen, 1905.
Jim Blount.  The 1900s:  100 Years In the History of Butler County, Ohio.  Hamilton, Ohio:  Past Present Press, 2000.
Butler County Engineer's Office.  Butler County Official Transportation Map, 2003.  Fairfield Township, Butler County, Ohio:  The Office, 2003.
A History and Biographical Cyclopaedia of Butler County, Ohio with Illustrations and Sketches of Its Representative Men and Pioneers.  Cincinnati, Ohio:  Western Biographical Publishing Company, 1882. 
Ohio. Secretary of State.  The Ohio municipal and township roster, 2002-2003.  Columbus, Ohio:  The Secretary, 2003.

External links
Township website
County website
St. Clair Township Fire Department

Townships in Butler County, Ohio
Townships in Ohio
1803 establishments in Ohio
Populated places established in 1803